Téra Airport  is an airport serving Téra in Niger.

Airports in Niger